Gaz Sardi-ye Shahabad (also Romanized as Gaz Sardī-ye Shāhābād; also known as Gaz Sardī) is a village in Nehzatabad Rural District, in the Central District of Rudbar-e Jonubi County, Kerman Province, Iran. At the 2006 census, its population was 671, in 133 families.

References 

Populated places in Rudbar-e Jonubi County